Food play can have sexual or non-sexual connotations. The term often refers to sitophilia, a form of sexual fetishism in which participants are aroused by erotic situations involving food. The phrase is also used to refer to non-sexual play with food, such as playful and decorative food displays, enjoyment of preparing food, or even a play about food. This article refers to the sitophilia connotation of food play.

Some foods and herbs themselves are purported to cause sexual arousal in and of themselves. Food play overlaps with other fetishes, including wet and messy fetishism, feederism, and nyotaimori. It is differentiated from vorarephilia (often shortened to "vore") in that food play fetishizes food while vore fetishizes the act of eating a living creature, or being eaten alive.

Practice
Certain fruits (e.g., bananas), vegetables (e.g., cucumbers and zucchinis) and processed meat (e.g., sausages and hot dogs), if used safely, may be fetish objects because they have a phallic shape, and can be substitutes for dildos, useful for vaginal or anal penetration. Other foods are so constituted that they can be sexually penetrated by a penis, if an appropriate hole is drilled in them, such as the namesake of American Pie.

Francesco Morackini, an Austrian designer and artist, designed and created a home dildo maker. It allows phallic food to be sculpted into an even more phallic shape for easier insertion.

Alcohol
A body shot is a shot of alcohol (such as tequila) that is consumed from a person's body, usually from the chest or stomach. There are two common types of body shot. In the first type, a person holds a wedge of lime in their mouth and has salt sprinkled on a part of their body. Another person drinks a shot from a shot glass, licks the salt off the body part and then takes the lime wedge with their mouth. In the second type, a person lies on a flat surface such as a floor, table or bar, and a shot is poured over a part of their body such as the navel. The shot is then licked up by another person.

The Japanese version, also called wakame sake and seaweed sake, similarly involves drinking alcohol from a woman's body. The woman closes her legs tight enough that the triangle between the thighs and mons pubis form a cup, and then pours sake down her chest into this triangle. Her partner then drinks the sake from there. The name comes from the idea that the woman's pubic hair in the sake resembles soft seaweed (wakame) floating in the sea.

See also 
 Nyotaimori
 Vorarephilia
 Wet and messy fetishism

References 

Sexual acts
Sexual fetishism
Sexuality in Japan
Paraphilias